Ernst Gerlach (born 19 March 1947 in Schönebeck) is a former East German handball player who competed in the 1980 Summer Olympics.

He was a member of the East German handball team which won the gold medal. He played one match and scored two goals.

External links
profile

1947 births
Living people
German male handball players
Handball players at the 1980 Summer Olympics
Olympic handball players of East Germany
Olympic gold medalists for East Germany
Olympic medalists in handball
Medalists at the 1980 Summer Olympics
People from Schönebeck
Sportspeople from Saxony-Anhalt